John S. Mills (1906 in Appleton, Wisconsin – July 4, 1996), was a major general in the United States Air Force. He attended Lawrence College.

Career
Mills graduated from the United States Military Academy in 1928. He served with the 11th Bomb Squadron and the 28th Bomb Squadron. During World War II he served as Chief of Operations of the Mediterranean Allied Air Forces. Following the war he entered the National War College. Later in his career he served as Assistant Deputy Chief of Staff for Personnel and Assistant Deputy Chief of Staff for Development of the Air Force.

Awards he received include the Distinguished Service Medal, the Silver Star, the Legion of Merit, the Distinguished Flying Cross, and the Air Medal with two oak leaf clusters.

References

1906 births
1996 deaths
People from Appleton, Wisconsin
Military personnel from Wisconsin
United States Air Force generals
Recipients of the Distinguished Service Medal (US Army)
Recipients of the Silver Star
Recipients of the Legion of Merit
Recipients of the Distinguished Flying Cross (United States)
Recipients of the Air Medal
United States Army personnel of World War II
United States Military Academy alumni
Lawrence University alumni